ZNNT-FM is a religious radio station in Nassau, Bahamas more popularly known as Gospel 107.

External links 
 

Radio stations in the Bahamas
Christian radio stations in North America